Węgle-Żukowo  is a village in the administrative district of Gmina Markusy, within Elbląg County, Warmian-Masurian Voivodeship, in northern Poland.

The village has a population of 130.

References

Villages in Elbląg County